Lothugedda junction is a village in Chintapalle mandal, Alluri Sitharama Raju district, in the Indian state of Andhra Pradesh.

References

Villages in Alluri Sitharama Raju district